Michael B. Skeen (born October 25, 1986) is an American professional sports car racing driver. He competes in the Trans-Am Series TA2 class for Stevens-Miller Racing.

Skeen has raced in the Pirelli World Challenge, Rolex Sports Car Series, Continental Tire Sports Car Challenge, WeatherTech SportsCar Championship, and the FIA World Endurance Championship. He has also raced in the NASCAR Xfinity Series and NASCAR Gander RV & Outdoors Truck Series as a road course ringer.

Racing career

Sports car racing
Skeen, along with Scott Heckert, were the drivers of Lone Star Racing's No. 80 Mercedes-AMG GT3 in 2018. They finished 6th in the 2018 standings, with two poles and one win during the season.

In 2020, Skeen joined the Trans-Am Series' TA2 class for Stevens-Miller Racing, and won the season opener at Sebring International Raceway.

NASCAR
Skeen ran one race in 2012 in the NASCAR K&N Pro Series West, driving the No. 31 Chevrolet at Utah. He finished 17th after starting 5th.

In 2013, Skeen debuted in the Truck Series, driving the No. 6 Chevrolet Silverado for Sharp Gallaher Racing in the Chevrolet Silverado 250 at Canadian Tire Motorsports Park. He finished 13th after starting 3rd due to a wreck in the final turn with Max Papis. The race ended controversially for Skeen as his girlfriend, Kelly Heaphy, slapped Papis after the race, allegedly dislocating his jaw. Heaphy was fined and suspended indefinitely, while Skeen's crew chief was also fined.

In 2018, Skeen made his Xfinity debut driving the No. 15 Chevrolet Camaro for JD Motorsports. He finished 28th, 6 laps down, after starting 24th.

Skeen returned to the Truck Series in August 2020, joining NEMCO Motorsports for the Sunoco 159 at the Daytona International Speedway road course.

Motorsports career results

NASCAR
(key) (Bold – Pole position awarded by qualifying time. Italics – Pole position earned by points standings or practice time. * – Most laps led.)

Xfinity Series

Gander RV & Outdoors Truck Series

 Season still in progress
 Ineligible for series points

K&N Pro Series West

Complete WeatherTech SportsCar Championship results
(key) (Races in bold indicate pole position; results in italics indicate fastest lap)

References

External links
 

Living people
1986 births
FIA World Endurance Championship drivers
NASCAR drivers
Racing drivers from North Carolina
Sportspeople from Durham, North Carolina
Trans-Am Series drivers
WeatherTech SportsCar Championship drivers
24 Hours of Daytona drivers
GT World Challenge America drivers
Starworks Motorsport drivers
Richard Childress Racing drivers
Michelin Pilot Challenge drivers
24H Series drivers